Scroggins is an unincorporated community in Franklin County, Texas, United States. According to the Handbook of Texas, Scroggins had an estimated population of 125 in 2000.

History
Settlement of the area began in the 1850s. The community was named after Milt Scroggins, a local sawmill operator. It eventually became a shipping point on the East Line and Red River Railroad, which was built through the area in 1877. Its post office was established in 1891. The sawmill remained in 1896 and added three stores. Its population was 25 from 1914 through the 1930s. At that time, it had only one store and several scattered homes. It began to grow sometime after World War II. It returned to three businesses and had 80 residents in 1952. Another business opened in the community in 1988 and the population grew to 125, which remained there in 2000. The community's general store owners, Ben and Joanne Glaze, organized the Catalpa Worm Festival in June 2004 to help foster community fellowship and celebration. Catalpa trees and their parasites are common in the community. The community has a post office with the ZIP code 75480.

Geography

Education
Scroggins is served by the Winnsboro Independent School District.

References

Unincorporated communities in Texas
Unincorporated communities in Franklin County, Texas
Populated places established in the 1850s